Joint Task Force Guantanamo (JTF-GTMO) is a U.S. military joint task force based at  Guantanamo Bay Naval Base, Guantánamo Bay, Cuba on the southeastern end of the base. JTF-GTMO falls under US Southern Command. Since January 2002 the command has operated the Guantanamo Bay detention camps Camp X-Ray and its successors Camp Delta, Camp V, and Camp Echo, where detained prisoners are held who have been captured in the war in Afghanistan and elsewhere since the September 11, 2001 attacks. From the command's founding in 2002 to early 2022, the detainee population has been reduced from 779 to 37. As of June 2021, the unit is under the command of U.S. Army Brigadier General Lance A. Okamura.

History

In 1992, the United States established Operation Sea Signal to prepare for a mass migration of refugees from Haiti and Cuba. In 1994, Operation Sea Signal led to the creation of Joint Task Force 160. JTF 160 was responsible for housing and processing more than 40,000 migrants awaiting repatriation or parole to the United States. Camp X-Ray was established to segregate migrants who had committed crimes, such as theft, assault and battery, prostitution and black-market activities, from other migrants and from U.S. civilians and military personnel at Guantanamo. In 1996, Operation Sea Signal came to an end and the military abandoned Camp X-Ray.

In December 2001, after the September 11 terrorist attacks and the United States intervention in Afghanistan, Joint Task Force 160 was reactivated. Camp X-Ray was prepared as a temporary location for the detention of people captured in Afghanistan who were believed to be part of the Taliban or al-Qaeda, neither of which the United States recognized as legal governments. In January 2002, the first detainees were transferred to Guantanamo Bay and housed in Camp X-Ray. The International Committee of the Red Cross (ICRC) had its first visit to the facility six days later. The ICRC has continued quarterly visits up to 2010.

Detention facilities
In April 2002, construction of the new 410-bed Camp Delta (Camps 1, 2, 3) was completed. The detainees were moved from Camp X-Ray to Camp Delta that month. In November 2002, Joint Task Force 160 and 170 were merged to create Joint Task Force Guantanamo.

By 2007 original Camp Delta compound was supplemented by Camps 4, 5 and 6.

Camp 4, opened in February 2003, featured communal style living areas, similar to a military barracks, and was used to house "compliant" detainees.

Camp 5, opened in May 2004, had segregated housing units (i.e. solitary cells) for detainees who are uncompliant or who pose a threat to other detainees or Joint Task Force staff members.  Camp 5 was closed in 2016 when the total detainee population was reduced to 61.

Camp 6, opened in November 2006, is patterned after a medium security prison with "pods" housing 10 to 20 detainees with individual cells but sharing a common living area.  Camp 6 houses the "general population".

As of late 2016, almost all detainees were housed in Camp 6.

Status of detainees

The status of these detainees is disputed. The United States government defines them as enemy combatants, claiming their status was not that of a prisoner of war as recognized under the Geneva Conventions (due to not being affiliated with any government, being alleged members of Al Qaida or groups affiliated with them).

In Rasul v Bush (2004), the Supreme Court held that the detainees had the right to counsel and to challenge their detentions at an impartial tribunal, according to habeas corpus. On 29 June 2006, the U.S. Supreme Court ruled in  Hamdan v. Rumsfeld that they had the minimal protection of Article 3 of the Geneva Conventions in that detainees must be housed and treated humanely, and that they had the right to an impartial tribunal to hear charges against them. It said the military tribunals as established by the Dept. of Defense did not have sufficient authority, and Congress needed to authorize any system outside the established US civil and military justice systems.
In Boumediene v. Bush (2008), the Supreme Court held that the detainees' right to habeas corpus could not be taken away by the Military Commission Act of 2006, which they ruled was unconstitutional. In addition, the Supreme Court held that detainees had the right to access federal courts to hear their habeas corpus challenges. Some of the cases are proceeding through the federal court system.

Intelligence task forces
In February 2002, Joint Task Force 170 was created as the intelligence task force to work side by side with Joint Task Force 160.  At a later date, JTF 170 was re-designated as the Joint Intelligence Group and was assigned as a subordinate element of Joint Task Force Guantanamo.  The other subordinate elements of JTF GTMO are the Joint Detention Group and the Joint Medical Group.

Joint Detention Group
The Joint Detention Group is one of the components of the Task Force. It is the organization assigned to guarding the captives, and maintaining camp security.
The guards within the Joint Detention Group come from the United States Army and the  United States Navy.

In 2009, guards outnumbered prisoners in Guantanamo by more than five to one.   With the acceleration of detainee releases from 2009 to the early 2010s, this ration increased greatly.

The officers commanding the Joint Detention Group, also known as the warden, have included:
Colonel Adolph McQueen, 2002
Colonel Michael Bumgarner, 2006
Colonel Bruce Vargo, 2008–2010
Colonel Donnie Thomas, 2010–2012
Colonel John Bogdan, 2012–2014
Colonel David Heath, 2014–2016
Colonel Stephen Gabavics, 2016–2018
Colonel Steven Yamashita 2018 – present

Living quarters
Enlisted personnel live in pre-fabricated quarters, similar to shipping containers. Each prefab unit houses four to six personnel.  Each prefab unit ships with a toilet and sink, but no internal partitions. Occupants are allowed to erect curtains to make temporary partitions, for privacy. Occupants share communal showers, shared between prefab quarters.

Officers and senior non-commissioned officers typically share cottages left over from family residences that were constructed when the base had a larger permanent population. Four occupants share a two-bedroom cottage.

According to Commander Daniel Jones, JTF-GTMO's Staff Judge Advocate:

The chow here is probably the best I've had and a mainstay of each day's activities. A "surf and turf" and special birthday meal are served at least once a month. By the end of your tour in GTMO you'll either weigh 300 pounds or be able to bench press 300 pounds. Nevertheless, you can look forward to a farewell BBQ and presentation of the highly coveted GTMO Bar Association Certificate.

Commanding officers
The past commanders of JTF-GTMO:
 Brigadier General Lance A. Okamura (USA), 2021 – present
Rear Admiral Timothy C. Kuehhas (USN), 2019–2021
Brigadier General John F. Hussey (USA), 2019
Rear Admiral John C. Ring (USN), 2018–2019
Rear Admiral Edward B. Cashman (USN), 2017–2018
Rear Admiral Peter J. Clarke (USN), 2015–2017
Brigadier General Jose Monteagudo (USAF), 2015
Rear Admiral Kyle Cozad (USN), 2014–2015
Rear Admiral Richard W. Butler (USN), 2013–2014
Rear Admiral John W. Smith Jr (USN), 2012–2013
Rear Admiral David B. Woods (USN), 2011–2012
Rear Admiral Jeffrey Harbeson (USN), 2010–2011
Rear Admiral Thomas H. Copeman III (USN), 2009–2010
Rear Admiral David M. Thomas Jr. (USN), 2008–2009
Rear Admiral Mark H. Buzby (USN), 2007–2008
Rear Admiral Harry B. Harris Jr. (USN), 2006–2007
Brigadier General Jay W. Hood (USA), 2004–2006
Major General Geoffrey D. Miller (USA), 2002–2004
Major General Michael Dunlavey (USA), 2002
Brigadier General Rick Baccus (USA), 2002
Brigadier General Michael Lehnert (USMC), 2002

Task Force motto

Joint Task Force Guantánamo's motto is "Honor Bound to Defend Freedom" and it was established during the command of Army Maj. Gen. Geoffrey Miller.

Representation in culture
Guantanamo: Honor Bound to Defend Freedom is the title of a 2004 book by Victoria Brittain (a former Guardian foreign editor) and novelist Gillian Slovo.
Guantanamo: Honor Bound to Defend Freedom is the title of a 2004 play, based upon interviews with the families of men detained in Guantanamo Bay, by the same authors. It premiered at the Tricycle Theatre in London in 2004 and transferred to Off Broadway.
Good Morning Gitmo is a one-act comedy written by Mishu Hilmy and Eric Simon in 2014. The play takes place decades into the future where the guards and staff have been forgotten at Camp Delta. It was originally produced by The Annoyance Theater in Chicago, Illinois.

See also
The Wire (JTF-GTMO)
Unlawful combatant

References

External links

Joint task forces of the United States Armed Forces
Guantanamo Bay detention camp
Military units and formations established in 2002